Kite, known as  in Japan, is a Japanese  original video animation written and directed by Yasuomi Umetsu. Two 35-minute episodes were released on VHS on February 25 and October 25, 1998, respectively. However, subsequent releases, including all three DVD releases in the United States, have edited the OVA into a film.

Plot
Kite revolves around a schoolgirl named Sawa who is orphaned in her early teens. Her parents are the victims of a gory double murder. When the film opens, Sawa is on a date with a celebrity, but he begins yelling at an old lady, who had rebuked him for promiscuous ways, being on a date with such a young girl.  Sawa kills him, and the old lady dies of a heart attack sometime later, after feeling around for her glasses in the bloody aftermath. The detectives investigating the crime, Akai and Kanie, are her guardians.  Akai has had a sexual relationship with Sawa for the duration of his guardianship. Akai also gave her a pair of crystal earrings, each one allegedly containing the blood of one of her parents.

Sawa is an assassin, who the corrupt detectives make kill an alleged rapist of young girls. Subsequently, over the years, she kills whomever she is ordered to, including corrupt police officers and corporate fat cats. Sawa's assassinations are famous among the police for her use of special bullets that explode inside the body after piercing the skin.

Eventually, Sawa meets a fellow assassin named Oburi, who is of a similar age, and a bond quickly forms between them. Due to their relationship, Sawa slowly gains the emotional strength to escape from her guardians to set out on her own. Oburi is leaving Akai and Kanie's service after killing three more targets, but Akai orders Sawa to kill Oburi instead of letting him go. Realizing that Sawa has the drop on him, Oburi tells her that Akai and Kanie were the ones who murdered her parents, but Sawa reveals that she has known that for years.

She lets Oburi live and goes to take out her next target. The bodyguards of this target nearly kill her in a struggle in the men's restroom. During it, she loses one of her earrings and sustains several minor injuries. When Oburi shows up alive, Kanie sends him after a corrupt district attorney, but the man is actually a SWAT officer, who nearly kills Oburi before Sawa arrives and saves him. Oburi confronts Akai and tells him that he and Sawa are both leaving, but Akai overpowers and savagely beats him. Sawa comes to Oburi's rescue again but is captured by Akai and Kanie. Akai appears to decide that just killing Oburi isn't enough, and after Akai says "Sawa, thank me", Kanie forces Oburi to watch Akai have sex with Sawa. The sexual intercourse ends when blood splatters on the bed.  When Kanie drags Oburi off afterward, Akai tells Sawa he's impressed with the depth of her plan to kill Oburi, saying that he almost believed her act. He tells her where Kanie is going to kill Oburi and that he is looking forward to finding Oburi's body. Sawa then leaves, saying she has an exam the next day.

The next morning, Akai arrives at a murder scene. He draws back the covering over the body and flinches when he sees it is Kanie. One of the crime scene investigators reminds him that the body's location is where a double murder occurred several years prior, when the parents of a teenage girl were killed. Akai then goes to where Kanie had been taking Oburi to confront him, but instead finds Sawa, who shoots him in the right hand and groin before emptying the magazines of both her and Oburi's guns into the rest of his body. She tosses both guns into the sewer, then removes her remaining earring and discards it as well.

Before Oburi and Sawa can reunite, Oburi is shot by another presumed child assassin – perhaps coincidentally a girl whose basketball he had destroyed near the beginning of the movie in response to an insult – and most likely the assassin Akai was talking about after raping Sawa for the last time. The scene changes to Sawa at Oburi's loft in an abandoned building, waiting patiently for his return. There is the sound of a footstep and a creaking floorboard, and Sawa turns her head to look at the source of the noise before the screen goes black.

Cast

Additional voices

English: Daniel Richani, Larry Tobias, Paul Johnson, Tamara Burnham-Mercer

Release history
A Kite was first released on VHS in Japan on February 25, 1998, and October 25, 1998, and was released on DVD in Japan on July 25 and December 18, 1998. An edited version titled A Kite: International Version was released on DVD in Japan on July 25, 2000. Another DVD set titled A Kite: Premium Collectors Version was released by Happinet on December 21, 2007. A DVD and Blu-Ray set titled A Kite Special Edition was released in Japan on April 3, 2015.

Three versions have been released in North America; the general release version, which was first released on VHS in May 1999 and DVD on April 25, 2000; a "Director's Cut" version that contains nearly 10 minutes of explicit footage, which was released on DVD on January 29, 2002, by Media Blasters' adult label, Kitty Media; and a "Special Edition" that contains Kite in its original, uncut form, which was first released on DVD on September 28, 2004.

Kite was released on DVD in Australia on September 21, 2005, and in New Zealand on September 11, 2005, by Madman Entertainment.

Due to Norway's strict child pornography laws, Kite has been banned due to a graphic scene of sexual assault on a minor.

Sequel
A sequel entitled Kite Liberator features a different cast of characters including a new character named Monaka Noguchi. It was released on April 8, 2008, in the United States and Japan and bundled with Kite: Director's Cut. Kite Liberator along with Kite were released in December 2013 on Netflix.

Live-action film

A live action film adaptation of Kite was reported to be in various stages of pre-production for several years, with American film director Rob Cohen attached as either director or producer. The content of the live action film is expected to be toned down from the original OVA. On September 2, 2011, David R. Ellis took the helm for the remake. On December 17, 2012 Samuel L. Jackson announced that he was the first to join the cast of Ellis's Kite, with filming taking place in Johannesburg. The film, which takes place in a post-financial collapse corrupt society, follows a girl who tries to track down her father's killer with help from his ex-partner. On February 3, 2013, Ralph Ziman took over as director of the film after Ellis died on January 7, 2013; actors India Eisley and Callan McAuliffe subsequently joined the cast. On May 10, 2013, The Weinstein Company acquired worldwide distribution rights for Kite, with a release date of August 25, 2014.

Reception
Kite is controversial in its depiction of extreme gory violence and sexual content, including graphic rape scenes involving a very young Sawa, which was depicted only in the extended version.

Helen McCarthy in 500 Essential Anime Movies called the anime a "shocking story of violence, abuse and perverted self-justification".

In popular culture
Kill Bill writer and director Quentin Tarantino recommended Kite as part of actress Chiaki Kuriyama's preparations for her role as Gogo Yubari in the first film.

Several scenes in the music video directed by Hype Williams for the song "Ex-Girlfriend" by No Doubt are based on Kite.

The Velvet Acid Christ song "Pretty Toy" samples one of Akai's lines from the English dub.

See also
 Mezzo Forte—Umetsu's second anime OVA, which also concerns a young woman working as an assassin, and a cameo by Sawa.
 Mezzo DSA—television series based on Mezzo Forte.
 Cool Devices: Yellow Star, previously directed by Umetsu, features "prototype" character designs, and similar subject matter.

References

External links
 Kite Information at Arms Company Website 
 
 
 Animerica review
  A dissection of the various releases of Kite.

1990s exploitation films
1998 anime OVAs
Animated films about orphans
Film controversies
Film censorship in Norway
Film controversies in Norway
Anime Works
Anime and manga controversies
Arms Corporation
Crime in anime and manga
1998 directorial debut films
Exploitation films
Films set in 1998
Girls with guns anime and manga
Hentai anime and manga
1990s Japanese-language films
Kitty Media
Obscenity controversies in animation
Obscenity controversies in film
Single OVAs
Anime with original screenplays